Église Sainte-Christine de Valle-di-Campoloro is a church in Valle-di-Campoloro, Haute-Corse, Corsica, located to the northeast of Cervione. The building was classified as a Historic Monument in 1840.

References

Churches in Corsica
Monuments historiques of Corsica
Buildings and structures in Haute-Corse